Valparaiso is a village in the Canadian province of Saskatchewan within the Rural Municipality of Star City No. 428 and Census Division No. 14. The village is located at the junction of Highway 3 and Range Road No. 160, approximately 20 km east of the City of Melfort. The name comes from that of Valparaíso in Chile.

History 
Valparaiso incorporated as a village on July 18, 1924.

Demographics 

See also

 List of communities in Saskatchewan
 Villages of Saskatchewan

References

Villages in Saskatchewan
Star City No. 428, Saskatchewan
Division No. 14, Saskatchewan